Ina-Maria Zweiniger-Bargielowska, known professionally as Ina Zweiniger-Bargielowska, is a British-American academic historian specialising in 20th-century Britain. Since 2010, she has been Professor of History at the University of Illinois at Chicago.

Biography 
Zweiniger-Bargielowska completed her undergraduate studies at Queen Mary College, University of London, graduating in 1985 with a first-class Bachelor of Arts (BA) degree in history and politics; she then carried out doctoral studies at the University of Cambridge, which awarded her a doctorate (DPhil) in 1990 for her thesis entitled "Industrial relationships and nationalisation in the South Wales coalmining industry". Her supervisor was Barry Supple.

From 1989 to 1990, Zweiniger-Bargielowska was a Research Fellow at the Institute of Historical Research, part of the University of London; she then spent three years as a Prize Research Fellow at Nuffield College, Oxford, before taking up a lectureship at the University of Wales, Aberystwyth, in 1993. In 2000, she was appointed Assistant Professor of History at the University of Illinois at Chicago (UIC) and a year later became an Associate Professor there. In 2010, she was appointed Professor of History at UIC.

Research 
Zweiniger-Bargielowska's research focuses on 20th-century British history; she has written on the Conservative Party, rationing in the United Kingdom, female consumers and the body, lifestyle and public health. Her publications include:

Works

Books
 (Edited with R. Duffett and A. Drouard) Food and War in Twentieth Century Europe (Ashgate: Farnham, 2011).
 She wrote the introduction and the chapter "Fair Shares? The Limits of Food Policy in Britain during the Second World War".
 Managing the Body: Beauty, Health and Fitness in Britain, 1880s–1939 (Oxford University Press: Oxford, 2010).
 (Editor) Women in Twentieth Century Britain (Pearson Education: Harlow, 2001).
 She wrote the introduction and the chapters on "Housewifery" and "The Body and Consumer Culture".
 Austerity in Britain: Rationing, Controls and Consumption, 1939–1955 (Oxford University Press: Oxford, 2000).
 (Edited with Martin Francis) The Conservatives and British Society, 1880–1990 (University of Wales Press: Cardiff, 1996).
 She co-authored the introduction with Martin Francis and wrote the chapter "Explaining the Gender Gap: The Conservative Party and the Women's Vote, 1945–1964".

Articles and chapters
 "The Making of a Modern Female Body: Beauty, Health and Fitness in Interwar Britain", Women's History Review, vol. 20, no. 2 (2011), pp. 299–317.
 "Slimming through the Depression: Obesity and Reducing in Interwar Britain", in D. J. Oddy, P. J. Atkins and V. Amilien (eds.), The Rise of Obesity in Europe: A Twentieth Century Food History (Ashgate: Farnham, 2009), pp. 177–191.
 "Raising a Nation of 'Good Animals': The New Health Society and Health Education Campaigns in Interwar Britain', Social History of Medicine, vol. 20, no. 1 (2007), pp. 73–89.
 "Building a British Superman: Physical Culture in Interwar Britain", Journal of Contemporary History, vol. 41, no. 4 (2006), pp. 595–610.
 "'The Culture of the Abdomen': Obesity and Reducing in Britain, c. 1900–1939", Journal of British Studies, vol. 44, no. 2 (2005), pp. 239–273.
 "Living Standards and Consumption", in P. Addison and H. Jones (eds.), Blackwell Companion to British History: Contemporary Britain, 1939–2000 (Blackwell: Oxford, 2005), pp. 226–244.
 "Women under Austerity: Fashion in Britain during the 1940s", in M. Donald and L. Hurcombe (eds.), Gender and Material Culture: Representations of Gender from Prehistory to the Present (Macmillan: Basingstoke, 2000), pp. 218–237. 
 "Rationing, Austerity and the Conservative Party Recovery after 1945", The Historical Journal, vol. 37, no. 1 (1994), pp. 173–197.
 "South Wales Miners' Attitudes towards Nationalization: An Essay in Oral History", Llafur, vol. 6, no. 3 (1994), pp. 70–84.
 "Bread Rationing in Britain, July 1946 – July 1948", Twentieth Century British History, vol. 4, no. 1 (1993), pp. 57–85.
 "Miners' Militancy: A Study of four South Wales Collieries during the Middle of the Twentieth Century", Welsh History Review, vol. 16, no. 3 (1993), pp. 356–389.
 "Colliery Managers and Nationalization: The Experience in South Wales", Business History, vol. 34, no. 4 (1992), pp. 59–78.

References 

Women historians
Alumni of Queen Mary University of London
Alumni of the University of Cambridge
Academics of the Institute of Historical Research
Fellows of Nuffield College, Oxford
Academics of Aberystwyth University
University of Illinois Chicago faculty
Living people
Year of birth missing (living people)